Matemore is a town and commune in Mascara Province, Algeria.

References

Communes of Mascara Province